Imeni Shaumyana may refer to:
 Shahumyan, Lori, Armenia
 Shahumyan, Yerevan, Armenia
 Şaumyanovka, Azerbaijan